Dihydroequilenin may refer to:

 17α-Dihydroequilenin
 17β-Dihydroequilenin

See also
 Dihydroequilin (disambiguation)